The Royal Prussian Army was the principal armed force of the Kingdom of Prussia during its participation in the Napoleonic Wars.

Frederick the Great's successor, his nephew Frederick William II (1786–97), relaxed conditions in Prussia and had little interest in war. He delegated responsibility to the aged Charles William Ferdinand, Duke of Brunswick, and the army began to degrade in quality. Led by veterans of the Silesian Wars, the Prussian Army was ill-equipped to deal with Revolutionary France. The officers retained the same training, tactics, and weaponry used by Frederick the Great some forty years earlier. In comparison, the revolutionary army of France, especially under Napoleon Bonaparte, was developing new methods of organization, supply, mobility, and command.

Prussia withdrew from the First Coalition in the Peace of Basel (1795), ceding the Rhenish territories to France. Upon Frederick William II's death in 1797, the state was bankrupt and the army outdated.

War of the Fourth Coalition 1806–1807
He was succeeded by his son, Frederick William III (1797–1840), who involved Prussia in the disastrous Fourth Coalition. The Prussian Army was decisively defeated in the battles of Saalfeld, Jena, and Auerstedt in 1806. The Prussians' famed discipline collapsed and led to widescale surrendering among infantry, cavalry, and garrisons. While some Prussian commanders acquitted themselves well, such as L'Estocq at Eylau, Gneisenau at Kolberg, and Blücher at Lübeck, they were not enough to reverse Jena-Auerstedt. Prussia submitted to major territorial losses, a standing army of only 42,000 men, and an alliance with France in the Treaty of Tilsit (1807).

Reform

The defeat of the disorganized army shocked the Prussian establishment, which had largely felt invincible after the Frederician victories. While Stein and Hardenberg began modernizing the Prussian state, Scharnhorst began to reform the military. He led a Military Reorganization Committee, which included Gneisenau, Grolman, Boyen, and the civilians Stein and Könen. Clausewitz assisted with the reorganization as well. Dismayed by the populace's indifferent reaction to the 1806 defeats, the reformers wanted to cultivate patriotism within the country. Stein's reforms abolished serfdom in 1807 and initiated local city government in 1808.

The generals of the army were completely overhauled — of the 143 Prussian generals in 1806, only Blücher and Tauentzien remained by the Sixth Coalition; many were allowed to redeem their reputations in the war of 1813. The officer corps was reopened to the middle class in 1808, while advancement into the higher ranks became based on education. King Frederick William III created the War Ministry in 1809, and Scharnhorst founded an officer's training school, the later Prussian War Academy, in Berlin in 1810.

Scharnhorst advocated adopting the levée en masse, the military conscription used by France. He created the Krümpersystem, by which companies replaced 3–5 men monthly, allowing up to 60 extra men to be trained annually per company. This system granted the army a larger reserve of 30,000–150,000 extra troops The Krümpersystem was also the beginning of short-term compulsory service in Prussia, as opposed to the long-term conscription previously used. Because the occupying French prohibited the Prussians from forming divisions, the Prussian Army was divided into six brigades, each consisting of seven to eight infantry battalions and twelve squadrons of cavalry. The combined brigades were supplemented with three brigades of artillery.

Corporal punishment was by and large abolished, while soldiers were trained in the field and in tirailleur tactics. Scharnhorst promoted the integration of the infantry, cavalry, and artillery through combined arms, as opposed to their previous independent states. Equipment and tactics were updated in respect to the Napoleonic campaigns. The field manual issued by Yorck in 1812 emphasized combined arms and faster marching speeds.  In 1813, Scharnhorst succeeded in attaching a chief of staff trained at the academy to each field commander.

Some reforms were opposed by Frederician traditionalists, such as Yorck, who felt that middle class officers would erode the privileges of the aristocratic officer corps and promote the ideas of the French Revolution. The army reform movement was cut short by Scharnhorst's death in 1813, and the shift to a more democratic and middle class military began to lose momentum in the face of the reactionary government.

The reformers and much of the public called for Frederick William III to ally with the Austrian Empire in its 1809 campaign against France. When the cautious king refused to support a new Prussian war, however, Schill led his hussar regiment against the occupying French, expecting to provoke a national uprising. The king considered Schill a mutineer, and the major's rebellion was crushed at Stralsund by French allies.

French invasion of Russia

The Franco-Prussian treaty of 1812 forced Prussia to provide 20,000 troops to Napoleon's Grande Armée, first under the leadership of Grawert and then under Yorck. The French occupation of Prussia was reaffirmed, and 300 demoralized Prussian officers resigned in protest.

During Napoleon's retreat from Russia in 1812, Yorck independently signed the Convention of Tauroggen with Russia, breaking the Franco-Prussian alliance. Stein arrived in East Prussia and led the raising of Landwehr (militia) to defend the province. With Prussia's joining of the Sixth Coalition out of his hands, Frederick William III quickly began to mobilize the army, and the East Prussian Landwehr was duplicated in the rest of the country. In comparison to 1806, the Prussian populace, especially the middle class, was supportive of the war, and thousands of volunteers joined the army. Prussian troops under the leadership of Blücher and Gneisenau proved vital at the Battles of Leipzig (1813) and Waterloo (1815). Later staff officers were impressed with the simultaneous operations of separate groups of the Prussian Army.

The Iron Cross was introduced as a military decoration by King Frederick William III in 1813. After the publication of his On War, Clausewitz became a widely studied philosopher of war.

Wars of Liberation

The Prussian, and later German General Staff, which developed out of meetings of the Great Elector with his senior officers and the informal meeting of the Napoleonic Era reformers, was formally created in 1814. In the same year Boyen and Grolman drafted a law for universal conscription, by which men would successively serve in the standing army, the Landwehr, and the local Landsturm until the age of 39.  Troops of the 136,000-strong standing army served for three years and were in the reserves for two, while militiamen of the 163,000-strong Landwehr served a few weeks annually for seven years.} Boyen and Blücher strongly supported the 'civilian army' of the Landwehr, which was to unite military and civilian society, as an equal to the standing army.

The Convention of Tauroggen became the starting-point of Prussia's regeneration. As the news of the destruction of the Grande Armée spread, and the appearance of countless stragglers convinced the Prussian people of the reality of the disaster, the spirit generated by years of French domination burst out. For the moment the king and his ministers were placed in a position of the greatest anxiety, for they knew the resources of France and the boundless versatility of their arch-enemy far too well to imagine that the end of their sufferings was yet in sight. To disavow the acts and desires of the army and of the secret societies for defence with which all north Germany was honeycombed would be to imperil the very existence of the monarchy, whilst an attack on the wreck of the Grand Army meant the certainty of a terrible retribution from the new armies now rapidly forming on the Rhine.

But the Russians and the soldiers were resolved to continue the campaign, and working in collusion they put pressure on the not unwilling representatives of the civil power to facilitate the supply and equipment of such troops as were still in the field; they could not refuse food and shelter to their starving countrymen or their loyal allies, and thus by degrees the French garrisons scattered about the country either found themselves surrounded or were compelled to retire to avoid that fate. Thus it happened that the viceroy of Italy felt himself compelled to depart from the positive injunctions of Napoleon  to hold on at all costs to his advanced position at Posen, where about 14,000 men had gradually rallied around him, and to withdraw step by step to Magdeburg, where he met reinforcements and commanded the whole course of the lower Elbe.

Hundred Days

Prussian Army (Army of the Lower Rhine)

This army was composed entirely of Prussians from the provinces of the Kingdom of Prussia, old and recently acquired alike. Field Marshal Gebhard Leberecht von Blücher commanded this army with General August Neidhardt von Gneisenau as his chief of staff and second in command.

Blücher's Prussian army of 116,000 men, with headquarters at Namur, was distributed as follows:
I Corps (Graf von Zieten), 30,800, cantoned along the Sambre, headquarters Charleroi, and covering the area Fontaine-l'Évêque–Fleurus–Moustier.
II Corps (Pirch I), 31,000, headquarters at Namur, lay in the area Namur-Hannut–Huy.
III Corps (Thielemann), 23,900, in the bend of the river Meuse, headquarters Ciney, and disposed in the area Dinant–Huy–Ciney.
IV Corps (Bülow), 30,300, with headquarters at Liège and cantoned around it.

German Corps (North German Federal Army)
This army was part of the Prussian Army above, but was to act independently much further south. It was composed of contingents from the following nations of the German Confederation: Electorate of Hessen, Grand Duchy of Mecklenburg-Schwerin, Grand Duchy of Mecklenburg-Strelitz, Grand Duchy of Saxe-Weimar-Eisenach, Duchy of Oldenburg (state), Duchy of Saxe-Gotha, Duchy of Anhalt-Bernburg, Duchy of Anhalt-Dessau, Duchy of Anhalt-Kothen, Principality of Schwarzburg-Rudolstadt, Principality of Schwarzburg-Sondershausen, Principality of Waldeck (state), Principality of Lippe and the Principality of Schaumburg-Lippe.

Fearing that Napoleon was going to strike him first, Blücher ordered this army to march north to join the rest of his own army. The Prussian General Friedrich Graf Kleist von Nollendorf initially commanded this army before he fell ill on 18 June and was replaced by the Hessen-Kassel General Von Engelhardt. Its composition in June was:
 Hessen-Kassel Division (Three Hessian Brigades)- General Engelhardt
 Thuringian Brigade – Colonel Egloffstein
 Mecklenburg Brigade – General Prince of Mecklenburg-Schwerin

Total 25,000

Prussian Reserve Army

Besides the four Army Corps that fought in the Waterloo Campaign listed above that Blücher took with him into the Kingdom of the Netherlands, Prussia also had a reserve army stationed at home in order to defend its borders.

This consisted of:

 V Army Corps – Commanded by General Ludwig Yorck von Wartenburg
 VI Army Corps – Commanded by General Bogislav Friedrich Emanuel von Tauentzien
 Royal Guard (VIII Corps) – Commanded by General Charles II, Grand Duke of Mecklenburg-Strelitz

Organisation of the Royal Prussian Army

Staff system
The Prussian General Quartermaster Staff (General-Quartiermeister-Stab) was initially established by Frederick William III in 1803. It was divided into three departments each corresponding with parts of the state. The Eastern brigade covering the territory east of the Vistula, the Western Brigade covering the territory west of the Elbe and the Southern Brigade covering the south of the kingdom. It was headed by a General Quartermaster (General-Quartiermeister) while a Lieutenant (General-Quartiermeister-Lieutenant) headed each brigade. This lasted until 1807 when the three brigades were merged. 
During peacetime they were to develop operational plans for defensive and offensive actions in any potential campaign. They were also to produce detailed maps. From 1808 they studied recent campaigns and considered potential future scenarios. In 1810 Frederick William decreed that staff officers serve with different branches so as to gain practical knowledge of soldiering. On mobilisation staff officers would then be distributed among the personal staff of generals in various commands.

Otto Von Bismarck generals

Army General Headquarters

Ranks of the Prussian Army
This chart shows the line Infantry, cavalry, and light Infantry ranking system for the Royal Prussian Army of 1808 onward. General der Infanterie & its equivalent, General der Cavallerie, were unused, however still official, from 1808 until December 1813. Do note that these ranks are in the contemporary German used by the Prussians, not modern German.
{| class="wikitable"
! Prussian Line Infantry Rank !! Cavalry Equivalent
!Light Infantry Equivalent
|-
|General-Feldmarschall || N/A
|N/A
|-
|General der Infanterie
|General der Cavallerie
|N/A
|-
|General-Lieutenant
|N/A
|N/A
|-
|General-Major
|N/A
|N/A
|-
|Oberst || Oberst
|N/A
|-
|Oberst-Lieutenant
|Oberstlieutenant
|N/A
|-
|Major|| Major
|Major
|-
|Capitän || Rittmeister
|Hauptmann
|-
|Premier-Lieutenant|| Premier-Lieutenant
|Premier-Lieutenant
|-
|Seconde-Lieutenant
|Seconde-Lieutenant
|Seconde-Lieutenant
|-
|Fähnrich || Fähnrich 
|Fähnrich
|- 
|Feldwebel || Wachtmeister
|Feldwebel
|-
|Sergeant || Unterwachtmeister
|Sergeant
|-
|Unterofficer
|Unterofficier
|Unterofficier
|-
|Gefreiter || Gefreiter
|Oberjäger/Oberschütze
|-
|Soldat (i.e. Musketier, Grenadier, etc.) || Reiter
|Jäger/Schütze
|}

The König could also serve as a military commander.

Organization of Army

Royal Guard
As of 1813, the Royal Prussian Army's Royal Guard consisted of the following regiments:

The following regiments were raised after Napoleon's exile in 1815, with the exception of the 2 grenadier regiments which were created in 1814 as a result of merging the provincial grenadier battalions:

Uniforms
Royal Prussian Army uniforms consisted of a variety of colors. The Regimental colors determined the colors of one's facing color (collar, cuffs, lapels before 1809) and button color.

See also
Military history of Germany
Prussian Army#Napoleonic era

Notes

References

Further reading
 

 

 — dissertation of the University of Bern (2001)

Armies of Napoleonic Wars